The 2012 Assen Superbike World Championship round was the third round of the 2012 Superbike World Championship season and of the 2012 Supersport World Championship season. It took place over the weekend of 20–22 April 2012 at TT Circuit Assen, Netherlands.

Superbike

Race 1 classification
The race was red-flagged after 13 laps because of rain and later restarted over 9 laps.

Race 2 classification

Supersport

Race classification

External links
 The official website of the Superbike World Championship

Superbike World Championship
Assen